Jane Pirie (27 March 1779 – 6 March 1833) was a Scottish woman who opened an exclusive girls' school in Edinburgh in 1809  and who became involved in a court case as a result of being accused of displays of "inordinate affection" with the co-founder of the school, Marianne Woods (1781–1870). Her accuser was Jane Cumming, a pupil of mixed race, and a granddaughter of Lady Helen Cumming Gordon, who alleged that the two women "engaged in irregular sexual practices" and "lewd and indecent behavior."

Jane Cumming was the first pupil to leave the school, and within days, all the other pupils left as well. Lady Cumming Gordon spread rumours of these allegations. Jane Pirie and Marianne Woods denied the allegations and sued Lady Cumming Gordon for £10,000.  Despite winning the case in 1812, the case was appealed to the House of Lords, which ultimately dismissed the appeal.  In the end, the financially ruined school teachers received little more than £1,000 after paying ruinous legal costs. Although Marianne Woods obtained part-time employment as a teacher in London, Jane Pirie stayed in Edinburgh and was unable to find employment, and "possibly had a nervous breakdown."

The story of the court case was the inspiration for Lillian Hellman's 1934 play The Children's Hour.  Two Hollywood films were inspired by this story: These Three in 1936 which starred Miriam Hopkins, Merle Oberon and Joel McCrea,  and the Hollywood filmThe Children's Hour in 1961 directed by William Wyler, which set the story in the United States and starred Audrey Hepburn, Shirley MacLaine and James Garner.

References

1779 births
1833 deaths
Schoolteachers from Edinburgh
Founders of Scottish schools and colleges
Lesbian history
House of Lords cases